Rodney Gordon Schutt (born October 13, 1956) is a Canadian former professional ice hockey player who played 286 games in the National Hockey League.  He played with the Toronto Maple Leafs, Montreal Canadiens, and Pittsburgh Penguins.

Career statistics

External links 

1956 births
Living people
Canadian ice hockey left wingers
Montreal Canadiens players
People from Hastings County
Pittsburgh Penguins players
Toronto Maple Leafs players
Ice hockey people from Ontario
Sudbury Wolves players
Montreal Canadiens draft picks
Cleveland Crusaders draft picks
National Hockey League first-round draft picks
Nova Scotia Voyageurs players
Erie Blades players
Baltimore Skipjacks players
Muskegon Lumberjacks players